"Medusa's Coil" is a short story by H. P. Lovecraft and Zealia Bishop. It was first published in Weird Tales magazine in January 1939, two years after Lovecraft's death. The story concerns the son of an American plantation owner who brings back from Paris a new wife. It mixes elements of Lovecraft's Cthulhu Mythos with the ancient Greek myth of Medusa, but it has also been noted for its racist aspects.

Plot
The unnamed narrator of the story is driving to Cape Girardeau, Missouri, but gets lost in the unfamiliar countryside. He comes across a rundown plantation house, and finds the only inhabitant is an emaciated old man named Antoine de Russy. The narrator asks if he could spend the night in the house. The old man agrees, and begins to tell him the tale of the place. He explains that he inherited the estate from his grandfather, and married in 1885. He had a son, Denis, who, as a young man, was sent to the Sorbonne in Paris. There, Denis met an artist, Frank Marsh, from New Orleans and the two men became involved in a mystical cult. Denis became infatuated with the head of the cult, a woman named Marceline, and married her. Around 1916, Denis returned to Missouri with his new wife, but Antoine and his servants found her strangely repulsive. When Frank Marsh came to visit, he developed a friendship with Marceline and insisted on painting her portrait.

Aware that his son may become jealous, Antoine arranged for Denis to be called away on business, while Frank Marsh set about painting Marceline. However, Denis comes home unexpectedly, entered the studio where Marsh was painting Marceline, and a fight took place. It was then that the painting was first revealed, showing the truth as to what Marceline really was. In horror, Denis killed Marceline, but her "blasphemous braid of coarse black hair" struck and killed Marsh "coiling around him as a python would". Denis confessed all of this to his father, and then killed himself. Antoine buried the bodies in the cellar, including the coil of hair around Marsh. Antoine comes to the end of his story, but offers to show his guest the horrific painting:

Horrified, the narrator pulls out a gun and shoots the painting. But this, as the old man explains, has now unleashed a curse: "She and that hair will come up out of their graves, for God knows what purpose!" The narrator flees to his car, and drives away just as the house is engulfed in flames. After several miles, the narrator stops and talks to a farmer, but the farmer explains that the old man mysteriously disappeared and the house burned down "five or six years" earlier. The narrator drives on, but mentions one final horror that he learned from details in the lost masterpiece of poor Frank Marsh:

Reception
The story is noted for its racist elements, especially with the final racist revelation which is intended to be the culminating horror of the tale. This racism may have formed an integral part of the original draft around which Lovecraft added elements such as the Cthulhu Cult.

When August Derleth published the story in an anthology in 1944, he changed the final line to: "though in deceitfully slight proportion, Marceline was a loathsome, bestial thing, and her forebears had come from Africa."

References

External links
 
 

1939 short stories
Atlantis in fiction
Cthulhu Mythos short stories
Fantasy short stories
Collaborative short stories
Missouri in fiction
Short stories by H. P. Lovecraft
Short stories published posthumously
Works originally published in Weird Tales